Mixosaurus is an extinct genus of Middle Triassic (Anisian to Ladinian, about 250-240 Mya) ichthyosaur. Its fossils  have been found near the Italy–Switzerland border and in South China.

The genus was named in 1887 by George H. Baur. The name means "Mixed Lizard", and was chosen because it appears to have been a transitional form between the eel-shaped ichthyosaurs such as Cymbospondylus and the later dolphin-shaped ichthyosaurs, such as Ichthyosaurus. Baur named Mixosaurus as a new genus because its forefin was sufficiently different from that of Ichthyosaurus.

Mixosaurus includes three species. Previously this number was bigger, and Mixosaurus was considered as the most common genus of Triassic ichthyosaurs, whose fossils  have been found all over the world, including China, Timor, Indonesia, Italy, Spitsbergen, Svalbard, Canada, as well as Alaska and Nevada in the US.

Description

It possessed a long tail with a low fin, suggesting it could have been a slow swimmer, but also possessed a dorsal fin for stability in the water. 
The paddle-like limbs were made up of five toes each, unlike the three toes found in later Ichthyosaurs. 
Noteworthy, however, is that each toe had more individual bones than is usual in reptiles, and the front limbs were longer than the back limbs, both adaptations typical of later ichthyosaurs. The jaws were narrow, with several sharp teeth, that would have been ideal for catching fish. 
They had relatively large skulls compared to their bodies, unlike the basal ichthyosaurs, but resembled fish-shaped ichthyosaurs that appeared later. 
They had around 50 vertebrae in front of the pelvic girdle, around twice as many as terrestrial diapsids. 
Recent studies suggest that genus Mixosaurus may have lived near shore or in a shelf-like habitat as it possesses more compact spongy bone within its long bones than other Ichthyosaurs.

Species
There are three species of Mixosaurus currently recognised, Mixosaurus cornalianus, Mixosaurus xindianensis and Mixosaurus kuhnschnyderi.
They share many similar characteristics throughout the cranial and post cranial with the main differences morphology occurring in the dental region. Examples of the dental variation are the extent of the dental groove in the upper jaw, the shape and size of the teeth and the number of rows of teeth 

Previous authors assigned other species to the genus, including M. atavus (Quenstedt, 1852), M. callawayi Schmitz et al., 2004, M. panxianensis Jiang et al., 2006 and M. yangjuanensis Liu & Yin, 2008. These are now included in Contectopalatus, Phalarodon, Barracudasauroides and Nothosaurus, respectively.

Mixosaurus species declared as nomen dubium, meaning the description was insufficient to fully classify them as a species, are M. maotaiensis, M. helveticus, M. timorensis, M. major, M. timorensis, M. nordenskioeldii.

Mixosaurus cornalianus
 
Many specimens of Mixosaurus cornalianus have been found from the Middle Triassic of Monte San Giorgio and the Tessin areas on the border of Italy and Switzerland.

Mixosaurus cornalianus is the only Triassic ichthyosaur for which completely articulated skeletons have been found. Many specimens have been collected but Mixosaurus cornalianus is not well studied, this is because all of the known specimens have been compressed during the preservation process.

Mixosaurus cornalianus has a sagittal crest associated with the expansion of the upper temporal fenestra. This indicates that it had exceptionally strong jaw muscles.

Mixosaurus panxianensis
Mixosaurus panxianensis was discovered in the Middle Triassic of the Guizhou Province, China. The specimens have been found in the Guanling Formation, which consists of thinly bedded bituminous limestones and marls.

The specimens found have important Mixosaurid characteristics such as a long sagittal crest along the top of the skull but is seen as a different species because there is no external contact between the jugal and the quadratojugal.

Articulated skeletons have been found and the centra of the vertebrae are higher than they are long. This is evidence for its transitional position between basal early Triassic ichthyosaurs and more derived Jurassic and Cretaceous species; who have disc shaped circular centra of the vertebrae. This species has been moved to its own genus, Barracudasauroides.

Classification
 
 
In recent years the taxonomy and phylogeny of mixosaurid ichthyosaurs has been a controversial topic. Most recently, Mixosauridae has been separated into Mixosaurinae and the sister group Phalarondontinae. Mixosaurus contains M. cornalianus, M. kuhnschnyderi and M. xindianensis, Barracudasauroides contains B. panxianensis, Phalarodon contains P. fraasi and P. callawayi, and Contectopalatus contains C. atavus.

Mixosaurids are characterised by a relatively short and wide humerus and Phalarodon are characterised by the lack of a dental groove in the upper jaw. Phalarodon fossils are found in every major Mixosaur locality.

It was suggested that Tholodus schmidi should be included in Mixosauridae but only dental material has been found so it is difficult to assign it to a genus.

Cladogram based on Motani (1999), Maisch and Matzke (2000), and Jiang, Schmitz, Hao & Sun (2006), with clade and generic names following Maisch (2010):

See also

 List of ichthyosaurs
 Timeline of ichthyosaur research

References

Middle Triassic ichthyosaurs
Middle Triassic reptiles of Asia
Middle Triassic reptiles of Europe
Middle Triassic reptiles of North America
Guanling Formation
Taxa named by Georg Baur
Fossil taxa described in 1887
Ichthyosauromorph genera